Vignano is a village in Tuscany, central Italy, in the comune of Siena, province of Siena.

Vignano is about 10 km from Siena.

Main sights
Sant'Agnese a Vignano, parish church of the village

Bibliography 
 

Frazioni  of Siena